Colin James Nutley (born 28 February 1944) is an English director successful in the Swedish film industry.

Career
Nutley went to Portsmouth Art College and began his career in British television as a graphic designer. He then turned to drama and documentary film-making for ITV, BBC and Channel 4. He directed the first two episodes of children's television series Press Gang, but was unhappy with the final edit so asked for his name to be removed from the credits.  He was, however, the driving force behind Southern Television's ITV-networked children's series The Flockton Flyer, taking personal responsibility for much of the casting, and acting as producer of the first series (filmed 1976, broadcast 1977) and producer/director of the second series (filmed 1977, broadcast 1978).

Nutley's work in Sweden began with the making of Annika, a TV series about a Swedish girl who spent three weeks on the Isle of Wight as a language student in England. Then came the documentary Where Roses Never Die, a film about life in a small Swedish country village which was also to become the inspiration for House of Angels.

His first feature The Ninth Company was a black comedy, the story of a group of young conscripts that tries to make a smart economic killing. Blackjack, was about love and betrayal in a small town, set against the backdrop of dance-music bands. House of Angels opened in 1992 and is to date one of the most loved Swedish films of all time. The film was awarded two Guldbagge Awards for "Best Film" and "Best Direction" at the Swedish Film Awards that year.

The Last Dance was a black comedy about a rollercoaster friendship between two big city couples, and won "Best Actress" and "Best Photography" awards at the 1993 Swedish Film Awards. House of Angels – the Second Summer opened on Christmas Day 1994 and was an immediate box office success. Such Is Life, a drama comedy about love, broken promises and fulfilled dreams, opened in Sweden in October 1996. Under the Sun, a story about trust, friendship and love set in the mid-1950s, opened on Christmas Day 1998 and Gossip, starring an ensemble cast of ten of Sweden's top actresses, opened all over Sweden on Christmas Day 2000. Deadline (2001) and Paradise (2003) were both based on Liza Marklund's best-selling novels. The Queen of Sheba's Pearls (2004) was an English language film set in post war England in the 1950s. Heartbreak Hotel opened in 2006 and Nutley's latest feature Angel in 2008.

House of Angels, The Last Dance and Under the Sun have all been nominated by the Swedish Film Institute to represent Sweden as Best Foreign Language Film at the Academy Awards (1993, 1994 and 1999). House of Angels was screened out of competition at the 1992 Cannes Film Festival. Under the Sun was nominated for an Academy Award for Best Foreign Language Film and also received the Special Jury Prize at the San Sebastian Film Festival.

He is married to the actress Helena Bergström, who has played the lead role in many of his productions. Their daughter Molly Nutley is also an actress.

Swedish TV
 Annika (1983) TV series
 Where Roses Never Die (Där Rosor Aldrig Dör) 1984 documentary
 Fifth Generation (Femte Generationen) 1985 series
 Long Way Home (Vägen Hem) 1989

Film
 The Ninth Company (Nionde Kompaniet) 1987
 Blackjack (Blackjack) 1990
 House of Angels (Änglagård) 1992
 The Last Dance (Sista Dansen) 1993
 House of Angels – The Second Summer (Änglagård – Andra Sommaren) 1994
 Such Is Life (Sånt är Livet) 1996
 Under the Sun (Under Solen) 1998
 Gossip (Gossip) 2000
 Deadline (Sprängaren) 2001
 Paradise (Paradiset) 2003
 The Queen of Sheba's Pearls 2004
 Heartbreak Hotel 2006
 Angel 2008
 House of Angels – Third Time Lucky (Änglagård – Tredje gången gillt) 2010

References

External links

English film directors
Swedish film directors
1944 births
Living people
People from Gosport
Best Director Guldbagge Award winners
British emigrants to Sweden
English expatriates in Sweden